Astro (stylized in all caps) is a South Korean boy band formed by Fantagio. The group is composed of five members: MJ, Jinjin, Cha Eun-woo, Moonbin, and Yoon San-ha. Originally a six-piece group, Rocky departed from the group on February 28, 2023. They debuted on February 23, 2016, with the extended play Spring Up and were subsequently named as one of the best new K-pop acts of 2016 by Billboard.

Career

Pre-debut
Astro was formed through the rookie talent development program "iTeen Boys", which was created by their current agency Fantagio. In August 2015, the final member line-up and group name were announced. The same month, the group starred in a web drama titled To Be Continued, which aimed to introduce them to the public. The drama featured the members as themselves, as well as Kim Sae-ron, Seo Kang-joon, and the girl group Hello Venus.

After their web drama finished airing, the group started the "Meet U" project. As part of the project, ASTRO traveled through South Korea, covering songs in front of crowds and holding fan meetings. Along with the performances, a KakaoTalk Plus Friends account was set up. Fantagio stated that once the group had gathered 10,000 friends on the app, they would announce their official debut date. The goal was met by December 2015. Their debut showcase, held on January 28, 2016, was sold out in under a minute and far exceeded the original limit of 1,000 attendants. There, they also announced their official fan club name, Aroha.

They also appeared in their own reality TV show titled Astro OK! Ready, which began airing on January 21, 2016, on MBC every1 and concluded on February 18, 2016.

2016: Debut with Spring Up and rising popularity
On February 23, 2016, Astro released their debut extended play Spring Up alongside its title track "Hide & Seek". For two days, starting on January 22, 2016, showcases and press conferences were held at Lotte Card Art Center and Wapop Concert Hall to commemorate the group's first release. Within a week of its release, Spring Up reached #6 on the Billboard World Albums Chart in the United States, as well as #4 on the Gaon Music Chart.
 On February 25, the group release the music video for "Cat's Eye" (장화 신은 고양이), containing clips from their web drama To Be Continued. On April 13, Astro was the only Korean act invited to the LeTV Entertainment Awards in China. Due to their popularity in China, Cha Eun-woo was also offered a role in a Chinese drama shortly after their debut.

Their second extended play Summer Vibes was released on July 1. The album peaked at #6 on the Billboard World Albums Chart and at #2 on the Gaon Weekly Albums Chart. Furthermore, the music video for "Breathless" (숨가빠), featuring labelmate Choi Yoo-jung of Weki Meki, surpassed half a million views in just 3 days. The same month, on July 31, Astro performed in front of more than 20,000 people at Staples Center in Los Angeles for KCON 2016.

Just five months after their debut, Astro held their first solo mini concert titled "ASTRO 2016 MINI LIVE - Thankx AROHA" from August 27 to 28 at the KEPCO Art Center in Seoul. Additional showcases were held in Japan, Indonesia, and Thailand throughout the months of October and November.

The group released their third extended play Autumn Story on November 10. The music video to its title track "Confession" (고백) featured Sei of Weki Meki. Simultaneously, their reality TV show Astro Project A.S.I.A, which explored the events of their first oversea showcases, began airing. In December, Billboard named ASTRO one of the best new K-pop groups of 2016.

2017–2018: First tour, group hiatus, and Rise Up
On February 22, 2017, one day before their one-year anniversary, Astro's four seasons project came to a close with their special album Winter Dream. The album and its lead single "Again" (붙잡았어야 해) were neither promoted on any music shows nor did they receive a music video. The group did, however, resume their overseas showcases with performances in Thailand, Taiwan, Singapore, and Hong Kong.

The group released their fourth extended play Dream Part.01, featuring the title track "Baby", on May 29.

The album placed 6th on the Billboard World Albums Chart. The same month, Astro signed a contract with Avex Taiwan to handle their music distribution in Taiwan, China, Hong Kong, and Southeast Asia.

On July 15, 2017, the group started their first tour, titled The 1st ASTROAD to Seoul, in Seoul at Olympic Hall, later expanding it with stops in Osaka, and Tokyo.

On November 1, Astro released their fifth extended play Dream Part.02, featuring the lead single "Crazy Sexy Cool" (니가 불어와). A limited "Wish" edition of the EP was released on January 10, 2018. All 10,000 copies were sold out in pre-orders alone. The edition contains a poem written by member Cha Eun-woo titled "Purple Evening", a hidden "Thanks to", as well as polaroid pictures taken by the members themselves.

The group held a second showcase in Taiwan on January 20, 2018, at the Taipei International Convention Center (TICC). Throughout the months of February and March, Astro held twelve fan meetings across nine cities around the world, visiting the United States, Canada, South Korea, Japan, and Thailand.

On July 24, after a prolonged hiatus, Astro released their second special mini album Rise Up alongside its lead single "Always You" (너잖아). Due to internal issues at their label, Fantagio Music, the album was not promoted on music shows. Still, the group proceeded to hold their second Japan tour The 2nd ASTROAD to Japan in August, with performances in Nagoya, Osaka, and Tokyo. Another tour titled The 2nd ASTROAD to Seoul [STAR LIGHT] (Part 1) in South Korea followed, concluding on December 23 with a last performance in Seoul at KBS Hall.

2019: First studio album All Night, Japanese debut with Venus, and Moonbin's hiatus
On January 16, 2019, following their 14-month hiatus without any full comeback, Astro released their first studio album All Light. To further promote the album, the group continued their The 2nd ASTROAD to Seoul [STAR LIGHT] tour with shows in Taiwan, the United States, Hong Kong, and Thailand. On January 29, they received their first music show win for "All Night" (전화해) on the SBS MTV music program The Show.

On April 3, Astro made their Japanese debut with the extended play Venus. The EP features three original Japanese tracks along with Japanese versions of their Korean singles "Baby", "Always You", and "All Night". The release was well-received by the general public, ranking third on the Oricon Weekly Album Chart and peaking at number one on the Daily Album Chart.

On November 12, Fantagio announced that Moonbin would be going on a hiatus to recover from health issues and focus on his treatment.

Subsequently, Moonbin did not participate in the promotions for the group's sixth extended play Blue Flame, which was released on November 20. His parts were therefore temporarily re-distributed amongst the remaining members. Despite this, he still took part in the recording of the EP and appeared in the music video for their lead single "Blue Flame".

2020: ONE&ONLY, Gateway, and first sub-unit Moonbin & Sanha
On February 14, 2020, Moonbin appeared in a V Live broadcast with the other Astro members, officially ending his hiatus. In celebration of their fourth debut anniversary, Astro released a special digital single album titled ONE&ONLY on February 23. A physical edition of the single was released on  March 13.

In May 4, Astro released their seventh extended play Gateway. On May 12, the EP's title track "Knock" earned the group their second win on the MBC M music show Show Champion. On June 28, Astro held their first online live streaming concert 2020 ASTRO Live on WWW., where they performed the song "No, I Don't" for the first time. On the same day, the single was distributed digitally through various streaming services.

On August 14, Fantagio confirmed that members Moonbin and Yoon San-ha would form Astro's first sub-unit called Moonbin & Sanha and that the recording for the unit's first extended play had already been completed. Their debut EP In-Out, featuring the lead single "Bad Idea", was released on September 14. Eight days later, on September 22, the sub-unit received their first music show award from The Show, making them the fastest K-pop sub-unit to receive their first win on a music show.

On December 31, Astro released the digital single "We Still (Be With U)" as a special year-end gift to their fans. The song is a re-arranged, winter-themed version of the track "We Still" from their seventh extended pay Gateway.

2021: Second studio album All Yours and solo activities
On April 5, 2021, Astro released their second studio album All Yours. The group received a total of three music show wins for its title track "ONE": the first one on The Show on April 13; the second on Show Champion on April 14; and finally on M Countdown on April 15, making it their first win on the program. On June 10, All Yours became the first Astro album to be certified platinum by Gaon.

On August 2, the group released their eighth extended play Switch On.The music video for its title track "After Midnight" garnered 10 million views in 34 hours, breaking the record previously set by "ONE". On August 10, they earned their first music show win for "After Midnight" on The Show.

Just one day after, the group received their second win on Show Champion, followed by their third win on Music Bank on August 13 and their fourth win on Show! Music Core on August 14. This also marked their first win on the latter two music shows and their first win on national TV since their debut. On October 7, Switch On was certified platinum by Gaon, making it their second album to reach platinum.

On September 2, Astro released the promotional single "ALIVE" for the mobile application Universe, the music video to which was distributed exclusively through the app. The song appeared at number 103 on the Gaon Download Chart.

On October 14, Fantagio confirmed that MJ would be the first member to promote as a solo artist. He made his solo debut with the semi-trot single album Happy Virus on November 3. The song was released digitally and was produced by trot musician Young Tak. The single also features child singer Kim Tae-yeon, who was also a contestant on Miss Trot 2. On November 29, MJ became the first K-pop idol to ever place first on the SBS music program The Trot Show.

2022–2023: Drive to the Starry Road, second sub-unit, MJ's enlistment, and Rocky's departure
On December 28, 2021, Fantagio announced that members Jinjin and Rocky would form Astro's second sub-unit, Jinjin & Rocky. The duo released their debut extended play Restore and its lead single "Just Breath" (숨 좀 쉬자) on January 17, 2022. On January 28, Fantagio announced that MJ would temporarily halt activities due to health issues.

Originally scheduled for March 13, Astro held their annual fan meeting ASTRO AROHA Festival to commemorate their 6th anniversary on April 9, this time titled 2022 ASTRO AROHA Festival [GATE 6]. The event was held both online and in person, making it their first fan meeting with a live audience since 2019, prior to the COVID-19 pandemic. During the fan meeting, MJ announced that he would enlist in the military as part of his mandatory military service on May 9, making him the first Astro member to serve. He's currently serving in the military band.

On May 16, Astro released their third studio album Drive to the Starry Road. The album features solo songs performed by all six members. While he would not be able to partake in promotional activities due to his military enlistment, MJ took part in the music video shooting. The album topped the Gaon Weekly Retail Album Chart in the week from May 15 to May 21, 2022, with 142,380 copies sold. Its lead single "Candy Sugar Pop" won a total of four music show awards: the first one on The Show on May 24, the second on Show Champion on May 25, the third on M Countdown on May 26, and the fourth on Music Bank on May 27.

From May 28 to May 29, Astro started their third solo concert tour The 3rd ASTROAD to Seoul [STARGAZER] at the Jamsil Indoor Stadium in Seoul. They continued their tour with The 3rd ASTROAD to Japan from June 3 to 4, selling out all 40,000 seats at Makuhari Messe International Exhibition Hall in Chiba near Tokyo.

On July 21, Astro released the promotional single "U&Iverse" for the Universe app through Universe Music. "U&Iverse" appeared at #95 on the Circle Download Chart.

On November 30, Astro released the Japanese single "Ichiban sukina hito ni sayonara wo iou" (1番好きな人にサヨナラを言おう). The music video features member Cha Eun-woo and Japanese actress and model Airi Matsui and was shot entirely in Japan. In addition, a solo version performed by Cha Eun-woo was recorded for the CD release.

On December 30, Fantagio released an official statement reporting that Jinjin, Cha Eun-woo, Moonbin, and Sanha had decided to renew their contracts, while Rocky's renewal was still in discussions and MJ's would be discussed after his discharge from the military. On February 28, it was announced that Rocky had ultimately decided to leave the agency and the group.

Members

Current
MJ
Jinjin
Cha Eun-woo
Moonbin
Yoon San-ha

Former
Rocky

Discography

All Light (2019)
All Yours (2021)
Drive to the Starry Road (2022)

Filmography

Film

Web series

Reality shows

Concerts and tours

Headlining tours
The 1st ASTROAD to Seoul (2017)
The 1st ASTROAD to Japan (2017)
The 1st ASTROAD to Taipei (2018)
The 2nd ASTROAD to Japan (2018)
The 2nd ASTROAD to Seoul [STAR LIGHT] (Part 1) (2018)
The 2nd ASTROAD to Seoul [STAR LIGHT] (Part 2) (2019)
The 3rd ASTROAD to Seoul [STARGAZER] (2022)
The 3rd ASTROAD to Japan [STARGAZER] (2022)

Headlining concerts
ASTRO 2016 MINI LIVE - Thankx AROHA (2016)
The 1st ASTRO AROHA Festival (2017)
ASTRO 1st Mini Concert in Taipei (2017)
ASTRO 1st Show in Hong Kong (2017)
The 2nd ASTRO AROHA Festival (2018)
The 3rd ASTRO AROHA Festival [BLACK] (2019)
The 4th ASTRO AROHA Festival [CAMPUS] (2020)
2020 ASTRO Live on WWW. (2020)
2022 ASTRO AROHA Festival [GATE 6] (2022)

Awards and nominations

References

External links

 on Fantagio 

South Korean boy bands
South Korean dance music groups
K-pop music groups
Fantagio artists
Musical groups established in 2016
2016 establishments in South Korea
Musical groups from Seoul